Kurzemnieks is a regional newspaper published in Kuldiga, Latvia.

External links 
Newspaper website

Newspapers published in Latvia
Mass media in Kuldīga